The An-Noor Mosque is a mosque in Mangilao, Guam.

History
The construction of the mosque started in 1997. It was then finished and opened in 2000 to become the only mosque on the island.

Activities
The mosque regularly holds five daily prayers, Friday prayers, Also known as (Jumu’aa) evening classes and community gatherings.

See also
 Islam in Guam

References

2000 establishments in Guam
Islam in Guam
Mosques completed in 2000
Religious buildings and structures in Guam